William Pulisic (born April 16, 1998) is an American professional soccer player who plays as a goalkeeper for Minnesota United 2 in the MLS Next Pro.

Youth career

Pulisic had played for Richmond United in his youth career. He, like his cousin Christian, who used to play at Borussia Dortmund, played with the Borussia Dortmund U19 team, making 8 appearances.

On July 7, 2017, Pulisic joined North Carolina FC U23 for the remainder of the 2017 season. In 2018, he also played in the PDL for Colorado Rapids U23 and again in 2019, returning to North Carolina FC U23's, but without making an appearance.

Club career 
On April 16, 2021, Pulisic signed with Major League Soccer club Austin FC. Pulisic was loaned to USL League One side North Carolina FC on March 9, 2022. Pulisic was released by Austin following their 2022 season.  On January 26, 2023, Pulisic signed a one-year contract with Minnesota United's MLS Next Pro team, MNUFC2.

International career

Pulisic has represented the U.S. at the youth international level. In 2015, he had been called up and was included in the final 23 man squad of the national under-17 team for the 2015 FIFA U-17 World Cup in Chile, along with his cousin, Christian, with 24 appearances.

He also made four appearances with national under-19 team.

Career statistics

Personal life

Will Pulisic was born in Mechanicsville, Virginia on April 16, 1998. He is the cousin of Chelsea player Christian Pulisic.

References

External links
 Duke Blue Devils bio

1998 births
Living people
American soccer players
Association football goalkeepers
Austin FC players
Soccer players from Virginia
People from Mechanicsville, Virginia
United States men's youth international soccer players
Duke Blue Devils men's soccer players
North Carolina FC U23 players
Colorado Rapids U-23 players
USL League Two players
American people of Croatian descent
North Carolina FC players